The following is a list of characters from the series SuperMansion.

League of Freedom

Titanium Rex
Titanium Rex (voiced by Bryan Cranston) is the aged leader of the League of Freedom and main character. Mirroring Superman and his Golden Age counterpart, he is a superpowered man who wears a cape and happens to be the "last of his kind" which were simply humans who lived underground in the Hollow Earth location of Subtopia. Titanium Rex considered himself the only survivor of a mission to the "fabled" surface world. Active since the late 1930s, his leadership stems from his super strength, flight, adaptability, and great wisdom. Due to time being fast on the surface of Earth, Titanium aged faster than the Subtopians that are still underground. In his old age, Titanium Rex is hindered by different elderly problems (i.e. back pain, bladder issues, erectile dysfunction) and many people have pressured him to retire. In addition, Titanium Rex and his kind have a weakness to the Anti-Magno Rod. He has affairs with multiple women leading to consequences that affect the plot where he had an affair with the villain Frau Mantis (who mothered Lex Lightning). Titanium Rex's right hand is naturally composed of titanium and it can fire devastating plasma beams.

In "The Gurman Files," it is revealed that Titanium Rex once used the alter ego of photographer Mel Gurman back in the 1970s until he faked that identity's death in a fire. Since then, Titanium Rex tries to resist working a camera. It was also revealed during the time he operated as Mel Gurman that he once had sex with Jancy Wheelihan much to Black Saturn's disgust.

Cooch
Cooch (voiced by Heidi Gardner) is an anthropomorphic female tabby cat with a southern accent who is a spoof of Tigra and Rex's pet cat. Crude, filthy, promiscuous, and very distractible, Cooch, however, proves useful when the need arises. She has an on again, off again relationship with Brad.

Cooch was once an ordinary tabby cat owned by a woman named Charlotte until she was hit accidentally by Dr. Devizo's Evo-Ray during his fight with Titanium Rex which resulted in her humanoid form and intelligence due to her switching its settings unintentionally from Devo to Evo. Titanium Rex took her in after seeing her attack Dr. Devizo for killing the mouse that she was going to eat.

Brad
Brad (voiced by Tom Root) is an unreliable, colossal pink man with blue hair who is a spoof of Hulk. His strength and large stature come from a pink super serum, and he is powered up by cocaine and heroin. Despite his heroic nature, Brad makes illicit drug deals over the phone. By the end of season one, Brad sacrifices his life to stop the mainframe that would launch nuclear missiles all over Earth by digging into the lava tunnels underneath the SuperMansion.

Black Saturn
Black Saturn (voiced by Tucker Gilmore) is a brooding black and purple-clad vigilante spoofing Batman. He has a wide array of gadgets and large chakram-shaped boomerangs are his weapon of choice (though they are never referred to as such and the word "ring" is used). Unlike Batman, Black Saturn's wealthy parents Cliff and Jancy Wheelihan are still alive and are annoyed with his immaturity, over-dependence, and refusal to get an actual job. He easily gets jealous and throws tantrums much like a teenager.

In "Black to the Future", an overweight Black Saturn travels back in time to stop American Ranger and Zenith from having sex as it results in the conception of their half-god child Gomorrah who grows up to become a supervillain threaten the world. It is revealed that Black Saturn inadvertently caused the death of Rex when he stepped in during Rex's battle with Gomorrah causing Rex to take a blow from Gomorrah that killed Rex who jumped in the way to save Saturn. The Future Black Saturn succeeds in stopping Gomorrah's conception only and returns to his future which has been altered, unfortunately, present Black Saturn messes up the future when he tells American Ranger he could become President, which results in a new future with a power-mad Future American Ranger. Before returning to his future Black Saturn maturely attempts to tell Rex to get rid of his present self before reverting to his former personality on realizing he just saved the future by preventing Gomorrah's existence. However, his warning causes Rex to contemplate kicking him off the team. It is also implied that Future Black Saturn and Future Groaner are a married couple.

In "The Gurman Files", it is revealed that Black Saturn gets his fighting skills from his mother. His real name was also revealed to be C.J. Wheelihan. During a conversation with his sidekick Ringler, he wishes that his parents had been killed in front of him, indicating he wishes he had a darker past.

Robobot
Robobot (voiced by Zeb Wells) is an introspective and soft-spoken robot man spoofing Red Tornado who is the brains of the group. He renames himself Jewbot after discovering his creator was Jewish and after befriending a rabbi who gives him a hat. It is revealed that he is actually a defective war-bot created by the government and dumped on Rex and the League by Sgt. Agony to save money. This revelation causes him to briefly become Emo and he ends up confronting some fellow war bots that were sold to the League's pizza parlor and turned into animatrons modeled after the league, who original programming he accidentally restored when he repaired them and was inadvertently activated by Courtney. While he attempted to reason with his so-called brothers, Robo-Titanium Rex pointed out that he was defective for being too compassionate and empathetic. He manages to stop his fellow war bots but Robo-Titanium Rex self-destructs destroying the Pizza Parlor but the League manages to get everyone out safely.

Jewbot later goes back to using the Robobot name in the episode "I Don't Even Have to Use My J.K." confessing that he has given up on Judaism after discovering that his creator was not really Jewish as he previously thought.

American Ranger
American Ranger (voiced by Keegan-Michael Key) is an exceedingly patriotic superhero (analogous to Captain America) who served in the original League along with Titanium Rex and Omega Ted.

Introduced in season one, American Ranger was placed in a time tunnel after serving in World War II. 70 years later, he rejoins the League of Freedom after being defrosted by a garbageman. Unlike his wife and Titanium Rex, American Ranger hasn't aged due to his preservation. A running gag is that American Ranger has a "stuck in a 1940s" mindset where he is even unable to grasp the concept of a black president.

In season two, American Ranger divorces his wife and becomes attracted to Portia Jones after he discovers he is aroused by being dominated by her. He also has an existential crisis after finding out that his pastor had convinced his parents to give up on finding him and encountering the Asteros in "Blazarmageddon" though he recovers after Asteros is revealed to be fake god. In "Black to the Future", Zenith seeks to mate with him though he is reluctant until she starts dominating him. This results in a future timeline where Zenith becomes pregnant with his half-god child Gomorrah who becomes a supervillain after being corrupted by her godly powers. But Future Black Saturn prevents Gomorrah's conception. Unfortunately, Black Saturn's present self gives him the idea he could become president, resulting in a power-mad President American Ranger to appear in his daughter's place in the future. In addition to competing with Portia's boyfriend Courtney, he also competes with Sgt. Agony for Portia's attention, though she grows tired of Agony and Ranger fighting over her causing her to choose Courtney over the both of them and leaves the team.

Zenith
Zenith (voiced by Yvette Nicole Brown) is an original member of the League of Freedom spoofing Thor though also with aspects similar to Storm, Captain Marvel, and Wonder Woman. She left the League of Freedom to host a popular television talk show called "A Talk in the Clouds" under her real name Portia Jones (a spoof of Oprah Winfrey) where she has a relationship with Courtney. Though Zenith and Rex got along well, Portia herself felt underappreciated despite her attempts to assist Rex as Portia, which later caused her to quit the team. Years later, she was convinced by Titanium Rex to rejoin the League of Freedom to take the place of Brad who was killed during a heroic act of saving the world. Upon Portia becoming the god-like Zenith, she can fly and wields a staff that shoots beams in battle. Zenith is a goddess and a separate identity from Portia who apparently lives with her mother in a heavenly realm. Portia is pursued romantically by American Ranger and Sgt. Agony, but eventually rejects both of them to rekindle her relationship with Courtney by the end of Season Two.

In "Black to the Future", Zenith's mother convinced her to seek out a human mate or her rage caused by not having sex would destroy mankind, though unbeknownst to Zenith, her mother had tricked her so she give her a grandchild. This causes her to seek to mate with Ranger in a misguided attempted to protect the Earth from herself, which results in the conception of their half-god daughter Gomorrah in the future. Unfortunately, Gomorrah was corrupted by being half-god and became a supervillain who joined the Injustice Gang and ended up killing Rex before turning on the other supervillains. Using Robobot's schematics to build an army of robot enforcers she rules Storm City in the future, forcing Black Saturn to travel back in time to stop Gomorrah's conception which he succeeded in doing, foiling her mother's plan to have a grandchild. However, this resulted Zenith being grounded in the Gods' Realm by her mother, preventing Portia from turning into her causing her to think about leaving the League due to her lack of super powers and the trouble her attempts to help the team as Portia had caused. Following the Subtopians' defeat, Portia leaves the League of Freedom much to the dismay of American Ranger and Sgt. Agony.

In "Home is Where the Shart Is", it was mentioned by Courtney that Portia lost her job after her beating up a gimp went viral and she has broken up with Courtney. American Ranger takes the opportunity to reconnect with Portia only for Sgt. Agony to answer the phone.

Ringler
Ringler (voiced by Breckin Meyer) is the sidekick (spoofing Bucky and Robin) of Black Saturn.

Introduced in Season Two, his true identity is Courtney, the dimwitted boyfriend of Portia Jones. He and Black Saturn get along well due to their shared immaturity. The two break up, but Portia ends up taking him back claiming as a complicated woman that she wants an uncomplicated man. But this forces Courtney to give up his superhero alter-ego after Portia quits the team.

In "Home is Where the Shart Is", Ringler reunites with Black Saturn after Portia broke up with him due to him posting the video of her torturing a gimp in Flesh Fest which cost her reputation and her job. Though Groaner warns Ringler to stay out of his way of dealing with Black Saturn.

Titanium Lex
Titanium Lex (voiced by Jillian Bell) is a beautiful red-haired young woman who is Titanium Rex's illegitimate daughter (spoofing Supergirl).

Introduced in season one, originally Lex Lightning, she visits the League of Freedom to catch up with her father and become a member of the League of Freedom, but is denied multiple times. Although Titanium Rex wants nothing to do with her at first, he later accepts responsibility and becomes a parent to her, though his lingering suspicions lead him to avoid teaching her the full extent of her powers. It is revealed that her mother was Frau Mantis, Titanium Rex's sworn enemy and was left in the care of Dr. Devizo. As a result of Lex having mantis DNA, she has the ability to transform her body physically and biologically from a female to a male and vice versa. She is defeated by Rex in Season One's finale, who blinds her with a point-blank plasma beam after disowning her.

By season two, Lex has recovered from her blindness and takes over leadership of the Injustice Club that she helped Dr. Devizo to form after she became frustrated with his leadership style and manages to steal the Anti-Magno Rod. As she is only half-Subtopian, she is only partially affected by the Anti-Magno Rod, as exposure to it does cause her to lose control of her bladder however the effect is somewhat delayed allowing her to be near it or hold it for only short periods, though after discovering the embarrassing effect it had on her she wisely elected to keep it contained. But during the Subtopian invasion, she discovers that Dr. Devizo had stolen it from the Injustice Club's safe, which allows him to retake control of the Injustice Club though he ends up joining forces with the league Lex, and Rex to take down her uncle Titanium Dax and the invading Subtopians. While working together with her father to steal a device to release Anti-Magno Rod radiation, she attempts to kill her father but finds herself unable to do so and inadvertently reveals her intended betrayal when her uncle Dax appears. Ultimately her father chooses to stay and battle Dax alone knowing he will likely die. But Lex refuses to leave Rex to die and fights Dax who is disgusted to learn she is Rex's half-Subtopian daughter due surface dweller heritage causing Dax focus on killing her instead. Dax assumes that Rex raised her and taught her only her to reveal she had figured out how to use her Titanium hand on her own and blasts Dax through a wall. Lex implies that the abilities she inherited from her mother allowed her to learn how to use it on her own as Rex had never taught her how to use it. Ultimately, she has a change of heart and rejoins the League of Freedom under the name Titanium Lex name while reconciling with her father following the Subtopian invasion. Though she was the one responsible for saving her father, Dr. Devizo took the credit for his rescue when she fell unconscious after saving Rex, thus she asks her father to speak for her at her upcoming trial as she is still considered a supervillain by the general public who are unaware of her role in saving Rex.

Omega Ted
Omega Ted (voiced by Tom Root) is a superhero that wields Omega Bands, is the owner of the Omega Pets, and is a member of the original League of Freedom back in World War II.

In the present, Omega Ted is killed by his own pets when they were left in Antarctica at the time when he and Titanium Rex were looking for American Ranger.

Red Riveter
Red Riveter (voiced by Jillian Bell) is a female superhero and a member of the original League of Freedom back in World War II. She wields a riveting gun in battle.

War Bond
War Bond (voiced by Tucker Gilmore) is a superhero and a member of the original League of Freedom back in World War II. His powers are advertising war bonds. While helping the Nazi experiment Swine Kampf fight the Nazis after he killed Adolf Hitler, American Ranger gave War Bond a bayonet and him doing his first kill led to him killing the Nazis.

Many years later, a retired War Bond became neighbors of Swine Kampf. Due to getting hooked on the killing, he blamed American Ranger for it and framed Swine Kampf until the League of Freedom and the Injustice Club subduing Swine Kampf unintentionally exposed him.

Villains

Dr. Devizo
Dr. Devizo (voiced by Chris Pine) is a mad scientist who is a former member of the League of Freedom and the primary antagonist of the series. Dr. Devizo became incensed with anger after learning that Titanium Rex was sleeping with his wife and vowed vengeance against the League of Freedom and the world.

It is revealed in season one that, at some point in his life, he was approached by Frau Mantis to watch over Lex Lightning following a brief fling with Titanium Rex. In addition, he also played a part in the origin of Cooch when he accidentally evolved her with his Evo-Ray gun during a fight with Titanium Rex.

In season two, Dr. Devizo and Lex Lightning become founders of the latest incarnation of the Injustice Club. However, Lex Lightning makes herself leader upon claiming the Anti-Magno Rod making Dr. Devizo jealous of her. It is revealed that Dr. Devizo has suspended accounts from Uber and Lyft because they claimed that he was "farting in cars". After saving Titanium Rex's life following the battle against the Subtopians, Dr. Devizo is pardoned for his crimes and is recruited by Sgt. Agony into overseeing the conduct of the League of Freedom.

Groaner
Groaner (voiced by Zeb Wells) is a skull-headed clown and evil prop comic with a bright red afro. After being imprisoned by the League of Freedom for dangerous pranks, Groaner later assists the heroes with dirty work. He has an intense on again off again rivalry with Black Saturn (spoofing the Joker's intense rivalry with Batman).

Introduced in season one, Groaner would resist killing Black Saturn since it would be hard for him to find another worthy superhero to fight.

In season two, Groaner becomes a member of Lex Lightning's Injustice Club. In "Black to the Future", his future self is implied to be married to Black Saturn's future self.

In season three, Groaner gets jealous of having to share a room with Black Saturn and Ringler.

Blue Menace
Blue Menace (voiced by Keegan-Michael Key) is a cat burglar who wears and utilizes a weaponized exo-suit created by the unseen villain Dr. Gizmo (whose name he mispronounces as "Jizzmo"). His exo-suit has retractable tentacles (spoofing Doctor Octopus).

Introduced in season one, Blue Menace does not stomach the thoughts of particularly brutal acts of violence such as tearing old ladies in half with his retractable tentacles.

In season two, he becomes a member of the Injustice Club.

Adolf Hitler
Adolf Hitler (voiced by Seth Green in season one, Breckin Meyer in season three) is the leader of the Nazi Party and an enemy of the original League of Freedom during World War II.

Unlike his historical counterpart, Adolf Hitler was killed when his creation Swine Kampf turned against him and threw him in the molten lava due to his nonstop pig jokes which he used to insult Swine Kampf relentlessly.

Frau Mantis
Frau Mantis (voiced by Famke Janssen) is a female Nazi who was an opponent for Titanium Rex, American Ranger, and Omega Ted during World War II and Lex's mother. Frau Mantis was the result of a Nazi experiment that fused human DNA with insect DNA. In the cause of Frau Mantis, she has mantis DNA which enables her to change her gender. She had a fling with Titanium Rex once. As a result of giving birth to Lex Lightning, Frau Mantis left her in the care of Dr. Devizo. During the final battle with Titanium Rex, Frau Mantis fell into the fires despite Titanium Rex's attempts to save her.

Omega Pets
The Omega Pets are the super-powered pets of Omega Ted until they went rogue and killed him because they were left in Antarctica at the time when Titanium Rex and Omega Ted were looking for American Ranger. When their motives are revealed, the Omega Pets fight the League of Freedom and Black Saturn's pet pig Murder Pig.

Buster Nut
Buster Nut (voiced by Tom Root) is a white squirrel who is a member of the Omega Pets.

Introduced in season one, Buster Nut possesses pressure points intuition and motor-manipulation abilities.

In season two, Buster Nut joins the Injustice Club alongside Chet.

Chet
Chet (voiced by Seth Green in season one, Zeb Wells in season three) is a white bulldog who is a member of the Omega Pets. By the end of season one, Chet is accidentally hit by the Evo-Ray Gun. As a result in season two, his evolved form now wears pants where he joins the Injustice Club alongside Buster Nut.

Ganky
Ganky (voiced by Clark Duke) is a white pony who was a member of the Omega Pets. Introduced in season one, Ganky possesses energy breath and fire breath. He was killed by Brad during the Omega Pets' fight against the League of Freedom and Murder Pig.

Blazar
Blazar (voiced by Ron Perlman) is an intergalactic villain who is the son and herald of Asteros (a spoof of both the Heralds of Galactus and Kalibak).

By the end of season one, Blazar is devolved into a monkey during a fight with the League of Freedom.

In season two, Blazar's monkey form is seen as a member of the Injustice Club. In "Blazarmageddon", his father Asteros came to Earth to destroy it in retaliation for what happened to Blazar. After Asteros is defeated, Blazar's monkey form retreats back to the Injustice Club.

Bugula
Bugula (voiced by Jordan Peele) is an insectoid and former enemy of Black Saturn. He first appears in "A Shop in the Dark" where Saturn still believes he is evil. However, Bugula has reformed and gotten custody of his child back on the condition that he constantly wears a leg collar that detects blood alcohol. Saturn tries to apprehend Bugula, putting multiple innocent bystanders in danger in the process by accidentally hitting them with blowgun darts full of tranquilizer. Eventually, Bugula decides to prevent further injuries to noncombatants by surrendering. Bugula jabs a tranquilizer dart into his own leg, triggering the leg collar since it turns out Saturn's darts contain 40 percent alcohol by volume. Bugula is arrested and loses custody of his child.

in "Iliga of Their Own," it is shown that Bugula was given a second chance and works at Iliga still annoyed that Saturn thinks he is evil and mad at him for the events of the last time they met when Ivan has Iliga employees fight the League of Freedom. Bugula is one of them and gives Saturn a big beating that leaves him seriously injured as revenge.

Robo-Dino
Robo-Dino (voiced by Chris Pine) is a mechanized-revived Tyrannosaurus who has a rivalry with Titanium Rex over the "Titanium Rex" name as he feels such a name is more suited for himself. While he has his normal arms, his cybernetic body has robotic arms to help him grab stuff. Introduced in Season One, Robo-Dino attempts at taking Titanium Rex's name includes an unseen lawsuit against Titanium Rex and the kidnapping of Lex Lightning.

He becomes a member of the Injustice Club in season two and seems to have accepted the Robo-Dino name.

In season three when the Injustice Club moves in with the League of Freedom in light of the Subtopian Invasion being stopped by Dr. Devizo, Robo-Dino is assigned to sleep in the bathtub.

Johnny Rabdo
Johnny Rabdo (voiced by Tony Cavalero) is a villainous fitness instructor. In season two, Johnny Rabdo joins the Injustice Club.

Rat-A-Pult
Rat-A-Pult (voiced by Jon Bernthal) is a rat-themed villain who wears a catapult weapon on his back. Rat-A-Pult is shown to be against murdering someone.

In season three, Rat-A-Pult works at Ilega.

Quiplash
Quiplash (voiced by Donald Faison) is a barbed whip-wielding villain who is Rat-A-Pult's partner-in-crime. He has a habit of telling quips and failing at them.

In season three, Rat-A-Pult works at Ilega.

Chad
Chad (voiced by Tucker Gilmore) is an Optocorp recruit who was used as a successor of Brad. The new Optocop serum makes Chad stronger than Brad because of Chad's higher chemical tolerance. Chad is hired by Optocorp to kill Brad and attacks the League of Freedom. Brad defeats him by getting Chad to overdose. Following Chad's defeat and the League of Freedom making off with Brad's formula, Optocorp's CEO decides to end the serum project realizing that Optocorp would make more money in energy drinks anyway.

Ivan Whiff
Ivan Whiff (voiced by Nat Faxon) is a billionaire contractor who often clashes with the League of Freedom. He first appears where he wants to recruit Lex Lightning into his team and was annoyed that Black Saturn wanted membership. Lex later stole the launch codes to some missiles which Dr. Devizo used in a plot to blow up Storm City. After Dr. Devizo's plot was thwarted, Whiff was grilled for letting this happened.

In season three, Whiff starts the organization Ilega with Bugula, Rat-A-Pult, and Quiplash as its members.

He shares similarities with Lex Luthor and Justin Hammer.

Gomorrah
Gomorrah (voiced by Yvette Nicole Brown) is the half-god daughter of American Ranger and Zenith who appears in "Black to the Future". She was conceived by the two after Zenith's mother convinces her that she must mate with a mortal man in order to prevent her rage from destroying Earth, when in reality her mother only wanted a grandchild. However, this inadvertently created a dark future timeline where Gomorrah was born and corrupted by her godly powers became a supervillain who joined the Injustice Club. Gomorrah fights Rex who would have defeated her had Black Saturn not jumped in and try to defeat Gomorrah, who took advantage of the distraction caused by Saturn to attack him only for Rex to shield him resulting in Rex's death. After Rex's death and the defeat of the League, she turned on the other supervillains and built an army of robot enforcers using Robobot's schematics. However, with the aid of Future Groaner, Future Black Saturn travels to the past to stop Gomorrah's conception. She hunts Future Groaner, present Black Saturn, Future Robo-Dino, and Future Robobot in the future and almost kills Black Saturn. Though Black Saturn's future self manages to stop her conception causing her to fade from existence revealing her grandmother's deception to Zenith in the present. However, present Black Saturn gives her father American Ranger the idea he could become President, resulting in a power mad President American Ranger to replace her.

Asteros
Asteros (voiced by Michael Dorn) is the father of Blazar who appears to be giant world destroying deity (a spoof of Galactus with some elements of Darkseid and the Wizard of Oz), though he is actually an elderly warlord who controls a giant mecha. He attacks Earth in revenge for his son being devolved into a monkey. The League attempts to destroy Asteros' planet destroying device with a nuke, but end up discovering Asteros and Blazar controlling the god mecha. He is quite arrogant as he claims to have built a god despite it being a ruse. Asteros is defeated by the League and his mecha is destroyed by the nuke, though its head survives and lands on Earth. He was presumably arrested, though Blazar's monkey form manages to escape as he rejoins the Injustice Club.

Titanium Dax
Titanium Dax (voiced by Dax Shepard) is a Subtopian warrior who is Titanium Rex's older brother (a spoof of General Zod and Black Adam with some elements of Ocean Master). He appears younger than Titanium Rex due to the aging differences between those who live on the surface and those who live in Subtopia. In Season Two, he comes to the surface in search of his lost younger brother whom he at first assumes has conquered the surface world for Subtopia. Though he is shown to care for his younger brother, he is appalled by his brother's aged appearance and looks down on non-Subtopians. A Subtopian warrior due to being the House of Titanium's eldest son, he invades other lands and enslaves people which causes him to come in conflict with Rex who had left a life in Subtopia behind and is disgusted to learn that Rex had sexual relations with dirt walkers (surface dwellers). But due to being younger and stronger, he easily defeats Rex and the League and attempts to force Rex to activate a Subtopian war beacon but Rex challenges him to fight to the death which forces Dax to swear to kill Rex to preserve his honor according to Subtopian tradition, though Rex defeats him but refuses to kill his own brother. Dax is imprisoned under SuperMansion but his actions make the government believe that Rex is a double agent forcing Rex to abandon the League out of protection. While imprisoned, Dax foils Sgt. Agony's attempts to sell SuperMansion due to him being imprisoned in the basement and threatening that his people will come, which comes true when a female Subtopian comes and frees him. With an army of Subtopians he conquers most of Storm City, forcing the League and Injustice Gang to join forces. Rex's betrayal seems to have caused him to develop an even more deep-seated loathing for surface dwellers as shown when his female underling displays an interest in the surface dweller TV series 2 Broke Girls, the stars of which he orders should be found and executed rejecting the notion of allowing any aspects of the surface dwellers culture to survive, under the pretense that it would give them hope. In addition to seeking to kill his brother, Dax also seeks to kill Lex due to his illegitimate niece being a Subtopian hybrid (which he refers to as a Titanium bastard). But Lex ends up defeating him by revealing the use of her own Titanium hand blasting him through a wall which leads Lex to give up on trying to kill Rex and rejoin the League.

Debbie Devizo
Debbie Devizo (voiced by Minnie Driver) is the ex-wife of Dr. Devizo and former lover of Titanium Rex. She was a superhero known as Heartshine who was a member of the League of Freedom. Rex had always assumed she retired to a retirement community before Devizo's betrayal of the League. In reality, Devizo left her stranded on a prison island for supervillains as revenge for having the affair with Rex. In order to survive on the island, she had to killed most of the villains and stole their items. Debbie sought revenge on Devizo for leaving her on the island, stealing Dr. Claptor's gauntlet that gives her the powers of multiple villains. It's also revealed in the future that Debbie was the reason Lex lost control to her insect side fully as she needed that form to finally defeat her.

Debbie goes after Dr. Devizo to kill him and easily defeats the League thanks to the power of the Gauntlets. As she battles Lex, she once again uses her insect side, but Devizo convinces her to change back. Devizo promises that she will be left in a comfortable prison. In reality, he returned Debbie to the island once more.

Supporting characters

Sgt. Agony
Sgt. Agony (voiced by Keegan-Michael Key) is a military grade accountant similar to Nick Fury who tries everything in his power to end the League of Freedom. By the end of season one, it is revealed that Sgt. Agony liked Brad and mourned his death.

Around season two, Sgt. Agony competes with American Ranger for the romance of Portia Jones. In "The League of Cheesedom", it is revealed that he was in charge of funding the military weapons program to create war robots that resulted in the creation of Robobot who was demeaned defective due to his compassion and empathy, causing Agony to dump him on the League to recoup the money spent to create him. It is also implied that he was responsible for Courtney getting ahold of war robots that had been repurposed into animatrons of the league for the League's Pizza Parlor, which went on a rampage after Robobot had repaired them before a show which inadvertently restored their military programming when Courtney attempted to fix Robo-Titanium Rex by hitting it. In "Logs Day Journey Into Night," Sgt. Agony gets his real estate license and tries to sell SuperMansion after Titanium Dax revealed Titanium Rex's purpose for reaching Earth's surface. In "Titanium Lex," Sgt. Agony and American Ranger are devastated when Portia leaves the League of Freedom following the repelling of the Subtopians.

In season three, Sgt. Agony has the Injustice Club move in with the League of Freedom after Dr. Devizo helped to stop the Subtopian invasion.

Gloria
Gloria (voiced by Heidi Gardner) is the elderly ex-wife of American Ranger and the former lover of Titanium Rex. She was a beautiful woman back in her youth but has aged horribly in the present. After American Ranger was left in the time tunnel and presumed dead. Gloria thought the same and began dating Rex even after American Ranger was found she had continued her affair with Rex in secret, Despite Ranger often trying to avoid her, He does try to make the marriage work acknowledging the difficulties because she had aged and he has not however after finding out about the affair, Ranger ends his friendship with Rex and his relationship with Gloria became strained, Ranger almost has a 1 night stand with a stranger but Rex and Gloria apologize and acknowledges that Ranger is trying hard to maintain his marriage to Gloria and she says she understands if he wants to end it, but they reconcile and Gloria agrees to try.

In "The Gurman Files", Gloria has broken her promise and Ranger sends divorce papers wanting to end their marriage now for good but Gloria refuses to sign the divorce papers and has been showing off her fetishes on Facebook and accompanies him to Flesh Fest 2017 at the time when Zenith is "grounded in the God's Realm." This leads to Portia and Gloria ending up in a "Gimp Off", but loses and signs the papers.

Cliff Wheelihan
Cliff Wheelihan (voiced by Seth Green) is the father of Black Saturn and Dudley who owns a cable company called CableVerse and is a parody of Thomas Wayne. Cliff is annoyed with Black Saturn's immaturity, over-dependence, and refusal to get an actual job. Black Saturn once worked for Cliff's cable company and was able to get even with his dad by helping Titanium Rex cancel his cable service from that company and trick him by scanning the check before ripping it up in front of Cliff. Though he was impressed with Black Saturn's relationship with Lex.

In "The Gurman Files," Cliff was mentioned to be on a camping trip with Dudley.

Jancy Wheelihan
Jancy Wheelihan (voiced by Heidi Gardner) is the mother of Black Saturn and Dudley who was a former model back in the 1970s and is a parody of Martha Wayne. Jancey is annoyed with Black Saturn's immaturity, over-dependence, and refusal to get an actual job.

In "The Gurman Files", it is revealed that Black Saturn gets his fighting skills from Jancy upon her and the Gurman Girls working together to defeat Frank Flava. In addition, she also had sex with Titanium Rex in his Mel Gurman alias which grossed Black Saturn out when he learned of this.

Dudley Wheelihan
Dudley Wheelihan (voiced by Anton Yelchin) is the younger brother of Black Saturn. Both Black Saturn and Dudley secretly dislike each other.

Bunsen
Bunsen (voiced by Dan Stevens) is the loyal butler of the Wheelihan family who is one of a few characters to not be annoyed by Black Saturn's antics. He is a parody of Alfred Pennyworth.

Zenith's Mother
Zenith's Mother (voiced by Heidi Gardner) is the unidentified ruler of the God's Realm. She wanted Zenith to mate with a human so that she can have a grandchild. Due to Future Black Saturn's intervention in light of an alternate future where Zenith and American Ranger's half-god child Gomorrah enslaving the world, Zenith's mother grounded Zenith to the God's Realm causing Portia Jones to be unable to channel Zenith's powers until further notice.

Deandre
Deandre (voiced by Breckin Meyer) is a man who works at Arby's.

Liplor
Liplor (voiced by Gary Anthony Williams) is a rock monster that was enslaved to Titanium Dax.

In season three, he joins the League of Freedom and grows a strong friendship with Cooch

Swine Kampf
Swine Kampf (voiced by Chris Pine) is a pig that was experimented on by the Nazis back in World War II so that the pigs can slaughter the men. He turned against Adolf Hitler after the pigs were insulted by throwing him in the lava and helping the League of Freedom. It was because of Swine Kampf's heroic activity that led to a bill that would enable a supervillain to reform into a superhero as seen in light of Dr. Devizo's activity years later.

In the present, Robobot is sent by Titanium Rex to find out what Swine Kampf has been up to. Robobot finds that Swine Kampf was repatriated to the United States under the name of Jonathan Hogsley where he has a non-managing position at Blockbuster Video. Though Robobot gets suspicious when he thinks that Swine Kampf has been murdering people as the Pig Man of Pasadena. Titanium Rex dispatches Robobot to find out more about Swine Kampf's current activity. When Robobot finds Swine Kampf's house, he learned that Swine Kampf gave American Ranger the credit of killing Adolf Hitler. When Robobot finds a corpse in the shed and goes on the attack, Swine Kampf puts on his mask and attacks Robobot. The League of Freedom and the Injustice Club shows up to help fight Swine Kampf until it was discovered that it was an elderly man who used to be War Bond that committed the crimes and framed Swine Kampf. Swine Kampf later forgave Robobot for the accusations as they compare themselves to be man-made creations.

References

SuperMansion
SuperMansion